Muscidora tricolor is a species of beetle in the family Cerambycidae, the only species in the genus Muscidora.

References

Trachyderini
Monotypic beetle genera